Brygos was an ancient Greek potter, active in Athens between 490 and 470 BC. He is known as a producer of excellent drinking cups. About 200 of his pieces are known. The workshop of Brygos employed a red-figure vase painter who is conventionally called the Brygos Painter. The Brygos Painter is one of the most famous vase painters of his time. His work is characterised by its high quality and realistic depictions. The workshop of Brygos also employed the Briseis Painter, among others.

See also
Pottery of ancient Greece
Art in ancient Greece

Bibliography
Ingeborg Scheibler. Griechische Töpferkunst, C. H. Beck.

External links
Getty Museum - Brygos Potter

Ancient Greek potters
Anonymous artists of antiquity